Denis Archibald West Payton (11 August 1943 – 17 December 2006) was an English musician who played tenor saxophone, baritone saxophone, guitar and harmonica in the rock and roll band the Dave Clark Five.

Biography
Payton was born in Walthamstow, then in Essex (now part of east London). As a child he learned to play guitar, saxophone and other wind instruments. As a teenager he played in a jazz band while studying to become an electrician. Through his band membership, he made acquaintance with members of other bands. Being a competent musician, he was often invited to join them, and he moved from one band to another. One of his acquaintances was Dave Clark, the leader of the group ‘Dave Clark Five with Stan Saxon’. When Saxon, who played saxophone and occasionally sang, departed in 1962 along with second saxophonist Jim Spencer, the group was renamed the ‘Dave Clark Five’, and Denis Payton became his successor.

In its early years, Dave Clark’s group primarily played instrumental music. While Stan Saxon sometimes sang, after his departure pianist Mike Smith (who later exchanged his piano for an electronic organ) provided the vocals. The group changed its repertoire from jazz and dance music to pop music.

After Payton’s arrival, the band’s line-up comprised Dave Clark (drums), Mike Smith (vocals and organ), Lenny Davidson (guitar), Rick Huxley (bass guitar) and Denis Payton (saxophone). This line-up remained unchanged for the next eight years. Apart from saxophone, Payton occasionally played guitar and harmonica (he played the harmonica solo on the group’s hit single "Catch Us If You Can" and played the sousaphone on "The Red Balloon"), and sang backing vocals. Payton also co-wrote over two dozen songs with Dave Clark for the group, two of which he sang lead vocals: "I Miss You" and "Man in the Pin Striped Suit".

The Dave Clark Five scored many big hits, both in the United Kingdom and the United States. Apart from "Catch Us If You Can", other million sellers were "Glad All Over", "Bits and Pieces" and "Over and Over". Payton enjoyed his finest hour when the great American jazz saxophonist Stan Getz, one of Payton's music idols, asked Payton for his autograph after attending a Dave Clark Five concert.

In 1970, the group disbanded. Payton became an estate agent in Bournemouth, but he continued to play in a few amateur bands in his spare time.

Death

When doctors discovered he had cancer, Payton had to give up his job. After a long illness, he died in Bournemouth in December 2006, at the age of 63. He left a wife, two sons and two stepsons. Following his death, it was discovered that Payton left an estate of £46,000.

In October 2006, two months prior to his death, the Dave Clark Five was nominated for induction into the Rock and Roll Hall of Fame. Payton told Dave Clark, who visited him on his sickbed: "I know I won’t be around, but it was an amazing part of my life that I am very proud of." The Dave Clark Five was inducted into the Hall of Fame on 10 March 2008. Surviving members of the band Dave Clark, Lenny Davidson and Rick Huxley were present; Mike Smith and Denis Payton were honoured with the band posthumously.

References

External links

1943 births
2006 deaths
English pop musicians
English rock saxophonists
British male saxophonists
People from Walthamstow
The Dave Clark Five members
Musicians from London
20th-century English musicians
Beat musicians
20th-century saxophonists
20th-century British male musicians
20th-century British musicians